Luton Town Football Club is an English football club, founded in 1885. After becoming the first professional team in the south of England in 1891, Luton joined The Football League in 1897 before leaving three years later. The club rejoined the League in 1920, and reached its top division in 1955–56. After losing the 1959 FA Cup Final 2–1 to Nottingham Forest, a period of decline saw Luton in the Fourth Division by 1965. After a swift revival the club was back in Division Two by 1970. Luton earned another promotion four years later, returning to Division One for the 1974–75 season, in which Luton were relegated back to the Second Division.

Financial crises during the 1970s led to the sale of important players and it was not until David Pleat, a former Luton player, was appointed in 1978 that Luton started to recover.  Pleat's team achieved promotion in 1981–82,  and remained in Division One until 1992. Luton won the League Cup in the 1987–88 season with a 3–2 victory over Arsenal, but it marked the beginning of decline. Inconsistent performance and financial uncertainty meant that Luton rose and fell through the divisions from season to season, and in 2007 a collapse began that would result in three successive relegations. The club claimed a Football League Trophy victory in 2009, but with it came the relegation to the Conference Premier made inevitable by 40 points deducted in two seasons. Luton contested five years in non-League football, including three unsuccessful play-off campaigns, before winning promotion to League Two as Conference Premier champions in the 2013–14 season. The club were promoted to League One after finishing second in League Two in 2017–18, and the following season they won a second successive promotion to the Championship after winning the League One title.

Key 

Top scorer and number of goals scored shown in bold when he was also top scorer for the division
Division shown in bold when it changes due to promotion, relegation or reorganisation
League results shown in italics for abandoned or wartime competitions

Key to league record
Pld = Matches played
W = Matches won
D = Matches drawn
L = Matches lost
GF = Goals for
GA = Goals against
Pts = Points
Pos. = Final position

Key to divisions
Champ = EFL Championship
Lge 1 = EFL League One
Lge 2 = EFL League Two
Div 1 = Football League First Division
Div 2 = Football League Second Division
Div 3 = Football League Third Division
Div 3 S = Football League Third Division South
Div 4 = Football League Fourth Division
Conf Prem = Conference Premier
South = Southern Football League Division One
South 2 = Southern Football League Division Two
United = United League
West 1B = Western Football League Division 1B
West 1A = Western Football League Division 1A

Key to rounds
Grp = Group stage
QR1 = Qualifying round 1
QR2 = Qualifying round 2
QR3 = Qualifying round 3
QR4 = Qualifying round 4
QR5 = Qualifying round 5
QR6 = Qualifying round 6
Int = Intermediate round
R1 = Round 1
R2 = Round 2
R3 = Round 3
R4 = Round 4
R5 = Round 5
R6 = Round 6
QF = Quarter-finals
SF = Semi-finals
RU = Runners-up
W = Winners
S = Southern sector

Seasons

Footnotes

References
General

Specific

Seasons
 
Luton Town F.C.